Morsbach is a municipality in the Oberbergischer Kreis, in North Rhine-Westphalia, Germany.

Morsbach or Mörsbach may also refer to:

 Morsbach, Moselle, a commune in the Moselle department in north-eastern France
 Morsbach (Wupper), a river of North Rhine-Westphalia, Germany
 Mörsbach, an Ortsgemeinde in the Westerwaldkreis in Rhineland-Palatinate, Germany
 Petra Morsbach (born 1956), German author